This is an incomplete list of castles in Japan, and focuses on those with some historical notability. Five of Japan's castles (Hikone, Himeji, Inuyama, Matsue and Matsumoto) are National Treasures.



A
Agena Castle, Uruma, Okinawa
Aizuwakamatsu Castle (Tsuruga Castle), Aizuwakamatsu, Fukushima
Akashi Castle, Akashi, Hyōgo
Akō Castle, Akō, Hyōgo
Amagasaki Castle, Amagasaki, Hyōgo
Aoba Castle, Sendai, Miyagi
Aya Castle, Aya, Miyazaki
Azuchi Castle, Azuchi, Shiga (see Azuchi-Momoyama period)

B
Beru Castle, Amami, Kagoshima
Bitchu Matsuyama Castle, Takahashi, Okayama
Bitchu Takamatsu Castle, Okayama, Okayama

C
Chibana Castle, Okinawa, Okinawa
Chihaya Castle, Chihayaakasaka, Osaka
Chinen Castle, Chinen, Okinawa

E
Echizen-Fuchū Castle, Echizen, Fukui
Echizen Ōno Castle, Ōno, Fukui
Edo Castle (Imperial Palace), Tokyo (Tōkyo)

F
Fukuchiyama Castle, Fukuchiyama, Kyoto
Fukui Castle, Fukui, Fukui
Fukui Castle, Ibaraki, Osaka
Fukuoka Castle, Fukuoka, Fukuoka
Fukushima Castle, Fukushima, Fukushima
Fukushima Castle, Kiso, Nagano
Fukuyama Castle (Hisamatsu Castle), Fukuyama, Hiroshima
Funai Castle, Ōita, Ōita
Fushimi Castle (Momoyama Castle), Kyoto (see Azuchi-Momoyama period)

G
Gassantoda Castle, Yasugi, Shimane
Gifu Castle (Inabayama Castle), Gifu, Gifu
Goeku Castle, Okinawa, Okinawa
Gujō Hachiman Castle, Gujō, Gifu
Gushikawa Castle (Itoman), Itoman, Okinawa
Gushikawa Castle (Kume), Kumejima, Okinawa

H
Hachigata Castle, Yorii, Saitama
Hachinohe Castle, Hachinohe, Aomori
Hachiōji Castle, Hachiōji, Tokyo
Hadano Castle, Hadano, Kanagawa
Hagi Castle, Hagi, Yamaguchi
Hakumai Castle, Matsuzaka, Mie
Hamamatsu Castle, Hamamatsu, Shizuoka
Hara Castle, Minamishimabara, Nagasaki
Hataya Castle, Yamanobe, Yamagata
Hayashi Castle, Matsumoto, Nagano
Hiji Castle (ruins), Hiji, Ōita
Hikone Castle, Hikone, Shiga
Himeji Castle, Himeji, Hyōgo, World Heritage Site
Hinoe Castle, Minamishimabara, Nagasaki
Hirado Castle, Hirado, Nagasaki
Hirosaki Castle, Hirosaki, Aomori
Hiroshima Castle, Hiroshima, Hiroshima
Hoshizaki Castle, Nagoya, Aichi

I
Ichigoyama Castle, Yoshii, Gunma
Ichijōdani Castle, Fukui, Fukui
Iga Ueno Castle, Iga, Mie
Iha Castle, Uruma, Okinawa
Imabari Castle, Imabari, Ehime
Ina Castle, Kozakai, Aichi
Inohana Castle, Chiba, Chiba
Inuyama Castle, Inuyama, Aichi
Itami Castle, Itami, Hyōgo
Iwabitsu Castle, Higashiagatsuma, Gunma
Iwakuni Castle, Iwakuni, Yamaguchi
Iwamura Castle, Ena, Gifu
Iwasaki Castle, Nisshin, Aichi
Iwayadō Castle, Ōshū, Iwate
Izena Castle, Izena, Okinawa
Izushi Castle, Izushi, Hyōgo

K
Kagoshima Castle, Kagoshima, Kagoshima
Kakegawa Castle, Kakegawa, Shizuoka
Kakunodate Castle, Kakunodate, Akita
Kameyama Castle, Kameoka, Kyoto
Kameyama Castle, Kameyama, Mie
Kami-Akasaka Castle, Chihayaakasaka, Osaka
Kamiizumi Castle, Yamanashi Prefecture
Kaminokuni Castle, Kaminokuni, Hokkaido
Kaminoyama Castle, Kaminoyama, Yamagata
Kanayama Castle, Ōta, Gunma
Kanazawa Castle, Kanazawa, Ishikawa
Kannonji Castle, Azuchi, Shiga
Kanō Castle, Gifu, Gifu
Karakawa Castle, Goshogawara, Aomori
Karasawa Castle, Sano, Tochigi
Karatsu Castle, Karatsu, Saga
Kasugayama Castle, Jōetsu, Niigata
Katsuren Castle, Uruma, Okinawa
Kawagoe Castle, Kawagoe, Saitama
Kawate Castle, Gifu, Gifu
Ki castle, Sōja, Okayama
Kihara Castle, Inashiki District, Ibaraki
Kikko Castle, Kagoshima, Kagoshima
Kikuchi Castle, Kikuchi, Kumamoto
Kishiwada Castle, Kishiwada, Osaka
Kitanosho Castle, Fukui, Fukui
Kitsuki Castle, Kitsuki, Ōita
Kiyosu Castle, Kiyosu, Aichi
Kōchi Castle, Kōchi, Kōchi
Kōfu Castle, Kōfu, Yamanashi
Kokura Castle, Kitakyushu, Fukuoka
Komakiyama Castle, Komaki, Aichi
Komine Castle (Shirakawa Castle), Shirakawa, Fukushima
Komoro Castle, Komoro, Nagano
Kōriyama Castle, Yamatokōriyama, Nara
Kubota Castle, Akita, Akita
Kumamoto Castle, Kumamoto, Kumamoto
Kunimine Castle, Kanra, Gunma
Kuniyoshi Castle, Mihama, Fukui
Kurono Castle, Gifu, Gifu Prefecture
Kurume Castle, Kurume, Fukuoka
Kururi Castle, Kimitsu, Chiba
Kushima Castle, Ōmura, Nagasaki
Kuwabara Castle, Suwa, Nagano
Kuwana Castle, Kuwana, Mie

M
Marugame Castle, Marugame, Kagawa
Maruoka Castle, Maruoka, Fukui
Matsue Castle, Matsue, Shimane
Matsukura Castle, Takayama, Gifu
Matsumae Castle, Matsumae, Hokkaido
Matsumori Castle, Izumi, Miyagi
Matsumoto Castle, Matsumoto, Nagano
Matsushiro Castle, Nagano, Nagano
Matsuyama Castle, Matsuyama, Ehime
Matsuyama Castle, Takahashi, Okayama
Matsuzaka Castle, Matsusaka, Mie
Mihara Castle Mihara, Hiroshima
Minakuchi Castle, Kōka, Shiga
Minato Castle, Tsuchizaki, Akita, Akita
Minowa Castle, Takasaki, Gunma
Mito Castle, Mito, Ibaraki
Mitsumine Castle, Sabae, Fukui
Miyao Castle site, Miyajima, Hiroshima
Mizusawa Castle, Oshu, Iwate
Momoyama Castle, see Fushimi Castle
Morioka Castle (Kozukata Castle), Morioka, Iwate
Motegi Castle, Motegi, Tochigi
Muro Castle, Toyohashi, Aichi

N
Nagahama Castle, Nagahama, Shiga
Nagamori Castle, Gifu, Gifu Prefecture
Nagaoka Castle, Nagaoka, Niigata
Nagashino Castle, Shinshiro, Aichi
Nagayama Castle, Hita, Ōita
Nago Castle, Nago, Okinawa
Nagoya Castle, Nagoya, Aichi
Nagoya Castle, Karatsu, Saga
Nagurumi Castle, Minakami, Gunma
Nakagusuku Castle, Kitanakagusuku, Okinawa
Nakatsu Castle, Nakatsu, Ōita
Nakijin Castle, Nakijin, Okinawa
Nanao Castle, Nanao, Ishikawa
Nanzan Castle, Itoman, Okinawa
Ne Castle, Hachinohe, Aomori
Nedo Castle, Abiko, Chiba
Negoya Castle, Otaki, Chiba
Nihonmatsu Castle, Nihonmatsu, Fukushima
Nijō Castle, Kyoto, World Heritage Site
Nirayama Castle, Izunokuni, Shizuoka
Nirengi Castle, Toyohashi, Aichi
Nishikawa Castle, Toyohashi, Aichi
Noda Castle, Aichi Prefecture

O
Obama Castle, Obama, Fukui Prefecture
Obama Castle, Iwashiro, Fukushima Prefecture
Obi Castle, Nichinan, Miyazaki
Odani Castle, Kohoku, Shiga Prefecture
Odawara Castle, Odawara, Kanagawa
Ōgaki Castle, Ōgaki, Gifu
Ōgo Castle, Ōgo, Gunma
Ōtawara Castle, Ōtawara, Tochigi
Ōita Castle, Ōita, Ōita
Oka Castle (ja), Taketa, Ōita
Okayama Castle, Okayama, Okayama
Okazaki Castle, Okazaki, Aichi
Omi Hachiman Castle, Ōmihachiman, Shiga
Onomichi Castle, Onomichi, Hiroshima
Osaka Castle, Osaka
Oshi Castle, Gyōda, Saitama
Otaki Castle, Otaki, Chiba
Oyama Castle, Haibara District, Shizuoka
Ōzato Castle, Nanjō, Okinawa
Ōzu Castle, Ōzu, Ehime

S
Saga Castle, Saga, Saga
Sagiyama Castle, Gifu, Gifu Prefecture
Saiki Castle, Saiki, Ōita
Sakura Castle, Sakura, Chiba
Sakurabora Castle, Gero, Gifu
Sano Castle, Sano, Tochigi
Sarukake Castle, Akitakata, Hiroshima
Sarukake Castle, Kurashiki, Okayama
Sasayama Castle, Sasayama, Hyōgo
Satowara Castle, Miyazaki, Miyazaki
Sawayama Castle, Hikone, Shiga
Sekiyado Castle, Noda, Chiba
Senshu Castle, Senshu, Osaka
Shakujii castle, Nerima, Tokyo
Shibata Castle, Shibata, Niigata
Shichinohe Castle, Kamikita District, Aomori
Shikizan Castle
Shimabara Castle, Shimabara, Nagasaki
Shimo-Akasaka Castle, Senshu, Osaka
Shimotsui Castle, Kurashiki, Okayama
Shinpu Castle, Nirasaki, Yamanashi
Shirakawa Castle, Shirakawa, Fukushima
Shiroishi Castle, Shiroishi, Miyagi
Shizugatake Castle, Shizugatake, Omi
Shoryuji Castle, Nagaokakyō, Kyoto
Shuri Castle, Naha, Okinawa
Sumoto Castle, Sumoto, Hyōgo
Sunomata Castle, Ōgaki, Gifu
Sunpu Castle, Shizuoka, Shizuoka

T
Tahara Castle, Tahara, Aichi
Taka Castle, Matsuzaka, Mie
Takada Castle, Jōetsu, Niigata
Takamatsu Castle, Takamatsu, Kagawa
Takamori Castle, Usa, Ōita
Takaoka Castle, Takaoka, Toyama
Takasaki Castle, Takasaki, Gunma
Takashima Castle, Suwa, Nagano
Takatenjin Castle, Kakegawa, Shizuoka
Takatori Castle, Takatori, Nara
Takayama Castle, Takayama, Gifu
Takeda Castle, Asago, Hyōgo
Takenoya Castle, Gamagori, Aichi
Taki-no-jō Castle, Tokorozawa, Saitama
Tamagusuku Castle, Tamagusuku, Okinawa
Tamanawa Castle, Kamakura, Kanagawa
Tanaka Castle, Fujieda, Shizuoka
Tatebayashi Castle, Tatebayashi, Gunma
Tateyama Castle, Tateyama, Chiba
Tatsuno Castle, Tatsuno, Hyōgo
Tobiyama Castle, Utsunomiya, Tochigi
Tokushima Castle, Tokushima, Tokushima
Tomigusuku Castle, Tomigusuku, Okinawa
Tomioka Castle, Reihoku, Kumamoto
Tomo Castle, Fukuyama, Hiroshima
Tottori Castle, Tottori, Tottori
Toyama Castle, Toyama, Toyama
Toyoda Castle, Joso, Ibaraki
Tsu Castle, Tsu, Mie
Tsuchiura Castle, Tsuchiura, Ibaraki
Tsuruga Castle, Tsuruga, Fukui
Tsurumaru Castle, Kagoshima, Kagoshima
Tsutsujigasaki yakate, Kōfu, Yamanashi
Tsuwano Castle, Tsuwano, Shimane
Tsuyama Castle, Tsuyama, Okayama

U
Uchi Castle, Kagoshima, Kagoshima
Ueda Castle, Ueda, Nagano
Uegusuku Castle (Kume), Kumejima, Okinawa
Uegusuku Castle (Tomigusuku), Tomigusuku, Okinawa
Uehara Castle, Chino, Nagano
Ueno Castle, Iga, Mie
Urado Castle, Kōchi, Kōchi
Urasoe Castle, Urasoe, Okinawa
Usuki Castle, Usuki, Ōita
Uto Castle, Uto, Kumamoto
Utsunomiya Castle, Utsunomiya, Tochigi
Uwajima Castle, Uwajima, Ehime
Uzuki Castle, Matsuyama, Ehime

W
Wakayama Castle, Wakayama, Wakayama
Washi Castle, Oyama, Tochigi

Y
Yagami Castle, Sasayama, Hyōgo
Yamada Castle, Onna, Okinawa
Yamagata Castle, Yamagata, Yamagata
Yamanaka Castle, Mishima, Shizuoka
Yanagawa Castle, Yanagawa, Fukuoka
Yatsushiro Castle, Yatsushiro, Kumamoto
Yodo Castle, Kyoto
Yokote Castle, Yokote, Akita
Yonago Castle, Yonago, Tottori
Yonezawa Castle, Yonezawa, Yamagata
Yononushi Castle, Wadomari, Kagoshima
Yoshida Castle, Toyohashi, Aichi
Yuzuki Castle, Matsuyama, Ehime

Z
Zakimi Castle, Yomitan, Okinawa
Zeze Castle, Ōtsu, Shiga

See also
100 Fine Castles of Japan
List of castles
List of National Treasures of Japan (castles)
List of foreign-style castles in Japan
Chashi, fortifications built by Ainu people
Gusuku, World Heritage castles of the Ryūkyū Kingdom